Marco Trungelliti (born 31 January 1990) is an Argentine professional tennis player and competes mainly on the ATP Challenger Tour and ITF Futures, both in singles and doubles.

On 4 March 2019, Trungelliti achieved his best singles rankings of world number 112. On 1 April 2013, he peaked at world number 174 in the doubles rankings. He has reached 22 career singles finals with a record of 9 wins and 13 losses which includes a 2–5 record in ATP Challenger Tour finals. In addition, he has reached 13 doubles finals with a record of 7 wins and 6 losses which included a 3-3 record in ATP Challenger Tour finals.

Career

2012: ATP debut
Trungelliti made his ATP Tour debut at the 2012 Croatian Open where he advanced through the 3 qualifying rounds by defeating Juan-Martin Aranguren 6–3, 6–2, Jose Anton Salazar Martin 7–6(7–4), 6–3 and Adrian Menendez-Maceiras 6–3, 6–2 to make his first appearance in a main draw. In the first round, he would go on to defeat Paolo Lorenzi 7–5, 6–4 before losing in the second round to Carlos Berlocq 6–7(4–7), 6–4, 1–6.

2016: Grand Slam debut

2018
At the 2018 French Open Trungelliti drove for 10 hours from Barcelona to Paris to be a late replacement for the injured Nick Kyrgios who had been due to face his compatriot Bernard Tomic. He only arrived to sign in shortly before midnight, and the match was scheduled first on court the following morning. Despite this Trungelliti defeated Tomic in four sets to make the second round at Roland Garros. He had been joined in his car journey by his mother and 89 year old grandmother who had happened to have been visiting from Argentina at the time.   He lost to Marco Cecchinato in the second round.

2021: Wimbledon debut
In 2021, he qualified for two consecutive Grand Slams for the first time in his career at the 2021 Wimbledon Championships and at the 2021 US Open. He became the only Argentinian to qualify at the All England Club and the only South American to qualify at the US Open. The Argentine saved six match points to defeat American  Aleksander Kovacevic in the final round of qualifying at the US Open, to make just his 8th main draw appearance at a Major. He defeated 29th seed Alejandro Davidovich Fokina in the first round to reach the second round for the first time at this Major before losing to fellow Argentine Facundo Bagnis.

2022
At the 2022 Australian Open he qualified again but lost in the first round in a five set match against Frances Tiafoe.

Personal life

Match-fixing testimony
Trungelliti was contacted by match-fixers in 2015 who told him that players could earn from a few thousand dollars for fixing a Futures level match up-to $50,000 to $100,000 for fixing an ATP level event. Trungelliti reported the event to the Tennis Integrity Unit (TIU) and the subsequent investigation which finished in 2017 led to bans for three Argentinean players.

ATP Challenger and ITF Futures/World Tennis Tour finals

Singles: 25 (9–16)

Doubles: 13 (7–6)

Performance timelines

Singles

Wins over top 10 players

References

External links
 
 

1990 births
People from Santiago del Estero
Living people
Argentine male tennis players
Sportspeople from Santiago del Estero Province
21st-century Argentine people